Pyotr Ilyich Vorobyov (born 28 January 1949) is a Russian professional ice hockey coach and former player. Vorobyov is the head coach of Lokomotiv Yaroslavl of the Kontinental Hockey League.

Playing career
Vorobyov played his whole career in the Soviet Championship League for Dinamo Riga (1968–79).

Coaching career
Vorobyov was an assistant coach for Dinamo Riga from 1982 till 1989, but in the 1989–90 season, he was the head coach. From 1990 till 1992, he was an assistant coach for Dynamo Moscow but in the 1992–93 season, he became their head coach. After that Vorobyov was the head coach for Frankfurt Lions, Torpedo Yaroslavl (as Lokomotiv Yaroslavl was known then), Lokomotiv Yaroslavl and Lada Togliatti. In 2006, Vorobyov became the head coach of the Latvia men's national ice hockey team. After that he returned to the Russian Superleague to coach Khimik Mytischy and Torpedo Nizhny Novgorod. When the Kontinental Hockey League began, he managed to reach the 1/8 final with Lada Togliatti. On 8 February 2010, he resigned from coaching Lada to return to Yaroslavl to coach Lokomotiv Yaroslavl once again. At the end of the season, he was hired to coach the junior team Loko of the Russian Junior Hockey League (MHL). Vorobyov is currently in his third stint coaching Lokomotiv, replacing Brad McCrimmon as head coach after McCrimmon and the entire team was killed in the 2011 Lokomotiv Yaroslavl plane crash.

References

External links
 

1949 births
Dinamo Riga players
Latvia men's national ice hockey team coaches
Living people
Russia men's national ice hockey team coaches
Russian ice hockey coaches
Soviet ice hockey centres
Ice hockey people from Moscow